Jean René Baroux (1922–1992) was a Morocco-born veteran of World War II and a writer very much engaged in the evolution of the French language. While a member of the Science Council of Canada (Director of Communications), in 1976 he founded the Association Québécoise des Professionnels de la Communication Scientifique (AQPCS), a complementary extension to the Canadian Scientific Writers Association.

Baroux was born in Casablanca. A veteran of the North African Corp from Morocco, he participated in the liberation of Italy first, and then France, from German occupation.  He fought in  what is considered the biggest and bloodiest land battle of World War II, the Battle of Monte Cassino, where an estimated third of a million people died through the first five months of 1944. He was also one of the soldiers who reached the demolished abbey, having been directly involved in the final, and decisive assault on German forces ensconced in the Benedictine Monastery. In August 1944, he landed with allied forces on the beaches around Saint-Tropez, France, as part of Operation Dragoon which launched a 25-mile front onto the German invasion forces in Provence.  He survived through another year of battle, moving North attacking the retreating German forces, through Gap, then Grenoble and on to Paris. He was awarded the Croix de Guerre for bravery in battle during the war. He died in Nanaimo, British Columbia, Canada.

Book
 La Méditation Intime (The Intimate Meditation) by Jean Baroux (1982): National Library of Canada

References
 L'OMNISCIENT - Bulletin de l'Association des Communicateurs Scientifiques - on the 25th. anniversary of ACS, formerly named AQPCS (May 2002).  
 L'OMNISCIENT - AQPCS - "Qui est le vrai fondateur?" ("Who is the real founder?")  (Article Spring 2002)  
 Agence Science Presse – "Le dernier voyage de Fernand Seguin" ("Fernand Seguin's Final Voyage")  (26 Nov.2008) 

Recipients of the Croix de Guerre 1939–1945 (France)
1992 deaths
1922 births
French military personnel of World War II
French expatriates in Morocco
French emigrants to Canada